The Blackstone Viaduct, or the New York & New England Railroad Viaduct is a historic viaduct in Blackstone, Massachusetts. The viaduct was built in 1872 by the Boston, Hartford and Erie Railroad and the American Bridge Company. It runs from the Blackstone River in the east to a still-watered section of the defunct Blackstone Canal to the west. The structure was listed on the National Register of Historic Places in 2002.

The viaduct was built as part of a project by the Boston, Hartford and Erie (BH&E) to build a complete run between New York City and Boston.  The first leg of this route, between Blackstone and Boston, was opened in 1849, and was purchased by the BH&E in 1867.  That company completed the connection between Blackstone and New Haven, Connecticut in 1873, part of which included construction of this viaduct, replacing an older wooden trestle.  By the early 20th century, some of the viaduct's arches were in deteriorating condition, and were reinforced with concrete in 1918.  The bridge over Canal Street was replaced in 1917.  The viaduct is one of the largest of the state's 19th-century masonry bridge structures, second in size only to the Canton Viaduct.

In March 1968 floodwaters washed away an abutment of the adjoining trestle to the east, causing its collapse. The bridge had been recently used by the New Haven Railroad for freight service, transporting automobiles. The crossing has not been rebuilt.

The first phase of a restoration project intended to convert the viaduct into a recreational facility including a bike path began in 2019. The bike path will travel over the viaduct and connect two disjointed sections of the Blackstone River Greenway, one 3.7-mile segment in Massachusetts terminating in the town of Blackstone, and a 0.6-mile stretch in Woonsocket, Rhode Island. As of 2021, the Greenway comprised a total of 17 miles of off-road bike path, along a planned 48-mile route between Providence and Worcester.

See also
National Register of Historic Places listings in Worcester County, Massachusetts

References

Railroad bridges on the National Register of Historic Places in Massachusetts
New York and New England Railroad
Buildings and structures in Blackstone, Massachusetts
Railroad bridges in Massachusetts
National Register of Historic Places in Worcester County, Massachusetts
Viaducts in the United States